Passage is the eighth studio album by American popular music duo the Carpenters. Released in 1977, it produced the hit singles "All You Get from Love Is a Love Song", "Calling Occupants of Interplanetary Craft" and "Sweet, Sweet Smile". The Carpenters' "Sweet, Sweet Smile" (written by Robert Otha Young and Juice Newton) was picked up by Country radio and put the duo in the top ten of Billboard'''s Country chart in the spring of 1978.

This album was a considerable departure for the siblings and contained experimental material such as the Klaatu cover "Calling Occupants of Interplanetary Craft" single—which reached no. 32 in the US but was a top ten hit in much of the world (and prompted numerous letters to the Carpenters asking when World Contact Day was scheduled). Coincidentally, the album's release predated Steven Spielberg's similarly themed film Close Encounters of the Third Kind by two months.  Nonetheless, the album was the group's first to fall short of gold certification in the US.

This is the only Carpenters album (aside from their Christmas albums) not to contain a Richard Carpenter or John Bettis song and also the second album to not have Karen playing drums at all. It was the first studio album since Close to You not to use the familiar Carpenters logo on the front cover, although a small version of the logo appears on the back cover.

Background and recording
Prior to the album's recording, a search was made for a new Carpenters producer, prompted by the band's decreasing popularity and Richard Carpenter's struggle with production duties (caused by his addiction to sleeping pills). However, according to Richard Carpenter, "not one major producer would sign on; radio was not quite as friendly at that time to our type of sound and to be honest, my track record on the whole was a tough act to follow. Accordingly, I remained producer, but I did try to approach this new project from a different angle, hence my selection of songs for this album made Passage a bit of a departure from our previous recordings."

Richard Carpenter recalled that "Don't Cry for Me Argentina" was "submitted to us by the publisher, and I immediately felt it was perfect for Karen, though now I feel differently, as I believe the song doesn't linger long enough in a lower register, a great area for Karen's voice. We contacted England's late, great Peter Knight to orchestrate the song, and two others on Passage''. Peter flew to Los Angeles to conduct the Los Angeles Philharmonic for the recording. (Due to a contractual agreement their name was not allowed in the credits, hence the credit of the "Overbudget Philharmonic"). Between the 100-plus member "Phil" and the 50-voice Gregg Smith Singers, the recording session had to take place on the A&M Sound Stage and was then wired into Studio D."

Reception

AllMusic has retrospectively described the Carpenters' effort as "admirable even if most of the results aren't memorable or essential." However, "All You Get from Love Is a Love Song" was described as, "much more memorable...had more of a beat than one was accustomed to in the duo's music."

Track listing

Personnel
 Karen Carpenter: Lead vocals, backing vocals (2)
 Richard Carpenter: Electric & acoustic piano (2, 3, 6, 8), tack piano (7), synthesizer (8), backing vocals (2)
 Pete Jolly: Piano (1)
 Larry Muhoberac: Electric piano (1)
 Tony Peluso: Electric guitar (1-3, 5-8), acoustic guitar (5), DJ (8)
 Ray Parker Jr.: Electric guitar (2)
 Lee Ritenour & Jay Graydon: Acoustic guitar (6)
 Jay Dee Maness: Pedal steel guitar (6)
 Joe Osborn: Bass (1-3, 5-8)
 Ron Tutt: Drums (1, 3, 5, 8)
 Ed Green: Drums (2, 6, 7)
 Wally Snow: Percussion (1)
 Tommy Vig: Percussion (1, 7), conga (2)
 Jerry Steinholtz: Conga (1), percussion (2)
 King Errisson: Conga (7)
 Tom Scott: Tenor sax (1 & 2), alto flute (1)
 Jackie Kelso: Tenor sax (7)
 David Luell & Kurt McGettrick: Baritone saxophone (7)
 Gene Puerling: Vocal arrangements (1)
 Julia Tillman, Carlena Williams, Maxine Willard: Backing vocals (2)
 Bobby Bruce: Fiddle (5)
 Larry McNealy: Banjo (5)
 Tom Hensley: Tack piano (5, 7)
 Earl Dumler: Oboe (3, 8)
 Gale Levant: Harp (3)
 Peter Knight, Gregg Smith: Conductor (3, 4, 8)
 Overbudget Philharmonic: Orchestra (3, 4, 8)
 Gregg Smith Singers: Vocals (3, 4, 8)
 William Feuerstein: Voice of Peron (4)
 Jonathan Marks: Voice of Che (4)
 Bernie Grundman, Richard Carpenter – remastering at Bernie Grundman Mastering

Singles
"All You Get from Love Is a Love Song" (US Hot 100 #35, US Adult Contemporary #4) US 7" single (1977) – A&M 1940
 "All You Get from Love Is a Love Song"
 "I Have You"

"Calling Occupants of Interplanetary Craft" (The Recognized Anthem of World Contact Day) (US Hot 100 #32, US Adult Contemporary #18) US 7" single (1977) – A&M 1978
 "Calling Occupants of Interplanetary Craft" (The Recognized Anthem of World Contact Day)
 "Can't Smile without You"

"Sweet, Sweet Smile" (US Hot 100 #44, US Adult Contemporary #7, US Country #6) US 7" single (1978) – A&M 2008
 "Sweet, Sweet Smile"
 "I Have You"

"Don't Cry for Me Argentina" CA 7" single (1978) – A&M 8629
 "Don't Cry for Me Argentina"
 "Calling Occupants of Interplanetary Craft" (The Recognized Anthem of World Contact Day)

Charts

Weekly charts

Certifications

References

External links 
 The Carpenters - Passage (1977) album releases & credits at Discogs

1977 albums
The Carpenters albums
A&M Records albums
Albums recorded at A&M Studios
Albums arranged by Peter Knight (composer)
Albums conducted by Peter Knight (composer)